Zabirah is a locality in northern Saudi Arabia.

Transport 

There are bauxite deposits in the vicinity, which is reason for proposed construction of a branch railway to serve mining.

See also 

 Railway stations in Saudi Arabia

References 

Populated places in Saudi Arabia